Sophisticated Ladies (also issued as “Sweet Substitute”) is an album by the English jazz/swing  all girl singing trio Sweet Substitute released in 1981 on the Black Lion Records label. At the time the trio consisted of Angie Masterton, Teri Leggett and Kate McNab. “Take Me to the Mardi Gras” and “Do You Know What it Means (To Miss New Orleans)” were recorded with Chris Barber’s band and Dear Mr. Berkeley with the Digby Fairweather Friends. "Take Me to the Mardi Gras" was issued as a 7" single in the UK and Germany in 1980.

Track listing

Side 1
"Lullaby of Broadway" (Harry Warren) – 2:43
"Sophisticated Lady" (Duke Ellington) – 4:14
"Tiger Blues" (Andy Leggett) – 4:09
"Sleepy Suzy" (Andy Leggett) – 2:23
"Take Me to the Mardi Gras" (Paul Simon) – 3:32

Side 2
"I Got an Uncle in Harlem" (Oran “Hot Lips” Page) – 3:11
"Good Morning Heartache" (Irene Higginbotham/Ervin Drake/Dan Fisher) – 3:22
"Dear Mr. Berkeley" (Andy Leggett) – 2:34
"Sweet Misery" Unaccompanied Voices  (Hoyt Axton) – 2:46
"Do You Know What it Means (To Miss New Orleans)" (Alter/de Lange) – 4:05
"Satin Doll" (Duke Ellington) – 2:34

Musicians
Trumpets: Kenny Baker, Bert Ezzard, Eddie Blair, Digby Fairweather, Pat Halcox, Chris Barber
Trombones: Pete Strange, Billy Lamb, Jack Thirwell, Chris Barber
Saxophones: Randy Colville, Bill Skeat, Danny Moss, Henry Mackenzie, Bernie George, Danny Moss, John Crocker, Andy Leggett
Guitars: Denny Wright, Andy Leggett, Johnny McCallum, Roger Hill
Piano: Barney Bates, Peter Wingfield
Bass: Len Skeat, Harvey Weston, Vic Pitt
Drums: Stan Bourke, Norman Emberson
Reeds: Ian Wheeler, John Crocker
Cornet: Digby Fairweather
Clarinet: Randy Colville

Production

Produced by: Alan Bates
Arrangers: Alyn Ainsworth, Andy Leggett,Digby Fairweather & Pete Strange
Recorded and re-mixed at: R. G. Jones Studios, Wimbledon, England
Recording Engineer: Gerry Kitchingham

References

1981 albums
Black Lion Records albums